Psophia is a genus of birds restricted to the humid forests of the Amazon and Guiana Shield in South America. It is the only genus in the family Psophiidae. Birds in the genus are commonly known as trumpeters, due to the trumpeting or cackling threat call of the males. They are rotund birds with long necks and legs and curved bills and a hunched posture. Their heads are small, but their eyes are relatively large, making them look "good-natured". The plumage is soft, resembling fur or velvet on the head and neck. It is mostly black, with purple, green, or bronze iridescence, particularly on the wing coverts and the lower neck. In the best-known taxa the secondary and tertial flight feathers are white, grey, or greenish to black, and hairlike, falling over the lower back, which is the same colour. These colours give the three generally accepted species their names.

Taxonomy and systematics

The genus Psophia was introduced in 1758 by the Swedish naturalist Carl Linnaeus in the tenth edition of his Systema Naturae to contain a single species, the grey-winged trumpeter (Psophia crepitans). The genus name is from the Ancient Greek psophos meaning "noise".

The genus' taxonomy is far from settled; from three to six species, with varying numbers of subspecies, are recognized by different taxonomic systems.

The International Ornithological Committee's treatment is the most conservative. They recognize three species, two of which each have three subspecies:

 Grey-winged trumpeter, Psophia crepitans
 P. c. crepitans
 P. c. napensis
 P. c. ochroptera
 Pale-winged trumpeter, Psophia leucoptera
 Dark-winged trumpeter, Psophia viridis
 P. v. viridis
 P. v. dextralis
 P. v. obscura

The Clements taxonomy splits P. v. dextralis and adds English names to the subspecies:

 Gray-winged trumpeter, Psophia crepitans
 P. c. crepitans (gray-winged)
 P. c. napensis (Napo)
 P. c. ochroptera (ochre-winged)
 Pale-winged trumpeter, Psophia leucoptera
 Dark-winged trumpeter, Psophia viridis
 P. v. viridis (green-backed)
 P. v. dextralis (dusky-backed)
 P. v. interjecta (Xingu)
 P. v. obscura (black-backed)

BirdLife International's Handbook of the Birds of the World (HBW) recognizes six species:

 Grey-winged trumpeter, Psophia crepitans
 P. c. crepitans
 P. c. napensis
 Ochre-winged trumpeter, Psophia ochroptera
 White-winged trumpeter, Psophia leucoptera
 Green-winged trumpeter, Psophia viridis
 Olive-winged trumpeter, Psophia dextralis
 P. d. dextralis
 P. d. interjecta
 Black-winged trumpeter, Psophia obscura

Traditionally only three species of trumpeters have been recognised. In 2008 a review of the morphology of the dark-winged trumpeter resulted in the recommendation of splitting it into three species. In 2010 a review of the phylogeny and biogeography of all members of the family resulted in a suggested total of eight species, including two in the grey-winged trumpeter complex, two in the pale-winged trumpeter complex, and four in the dark-winged trumpeter complex.

Behaviour and ecology
Trumpeters fly weakly but run fast; they can easily outrun dogs. They are also capable of swimming across rivers. They spend most of the day in noisy flocks, sometimes numbering more than 100, on the forest floor. They feed on fallen fruit (particularly fruit knocked down by monkeys). They also eat a small amount of arthropods, including ants and flies, and even some reptiles and amphibians.

Trumpeters nest in a hole in a tree or in the crown of a palm tree. In the pale-winged trumpeter and the grey-winged trumpeter, groups of adults care for a single clutch.

Relationship with humans
Trumpeters are often used as "guard dogs" because they call loudly when alarmed, become tame easily, and are believed to be adept at killing snakes. One source states their skill at hunting snakes as a fact, and the nineteenth-century botanist Richard Spruce gave an account of the friendliness and snake-killing prowess of a tame grey-winged trumpeter. For these reasons, Spruce recommended that England import trumpeters to India.  However, another source says this prowess is "reputed".

References

External links

Trumpeter videos on the Internet Bird Collection

Higher-level bird taxa restricted to the Neotropics
 
Bird genera